Anam Mollik (born 30 May 1989) is an Italian cricketer who plays for the national team. In May 2019, he was named in Italy's squad for the Regional Finals of the 2018–19 ICC T20 World Cup Europe Qualifier tournament in Guernsey. He made his Twenty20 International (T20I) debut for Italy, against Norway, on 15 June 2019.

References

External links
 

1989 births
Living people
Italian cricketers
Italy Twenty20 International cricketers
Place of birth missing (living people)